Caroline Ghosn (born January 29, 1987) is an American businesswoman. She is the eldest child of former Nissan and Renault CEO, Carlos Ghosn. In 2011, she founded  Levo (formerly Levo League), a professional network dedicated to helping millennials navigate  the workplace, and has been managing its development since then.

Ghosn is an active member of the World Economic Forum’s Global Shapers community and attended and spoke at the annual World Economic Forum in Davos in 2014.

Ghosn was recognized by Fast Company as one of the Most Creative People in Business in 2013. Ghosn was presented as a debutante at the Bal des débutantes in Paris in 2006.

Education
Ghosn graduated from Stanford University in 2008 with a bachelor’s degree. She has lived in six countries and speaks four languages.

Business career
In 2011 Ghosn founded Levo to help millennials achieve success in the workplace.

Ghosn currently serves as the CEO and Chairman of Levo's Board of Directors. Levo has an audience of over 9 million members globally, and 30 local Levo chapters around the world. The company has raised more than $9 million in angel investment with prominent investors including Gina Bianchini and Lubna Olayan. Facebook COO, Sheryl Sandberg, is also an investor in Levo and a personal mentor to Ghosn.

As part of Levo's “Office Hours” series, Ghosn has interviewed leading businessmen and women and influencers, including Warren Buffett, New York Senator Kirsten Gillibrand, actor Kevin Spacey, journalist Soledad O’Brien and designer Nanette Lepore.

Ghosn has spoken at a number of international conferences, including the 2014 World Economic Forum, Bloomberg's The Next Big Thing Summit, AMEX's CEO Bootcamp, and Cosmo’s Fun Fearless Life conference with Joanna Coles.

Since launching Levo, Ghosn has been named to Fast Company’s list of the Most Creative People in Business in 2013. Several days after her father was prosecuted in Japan, the website of her company levoleague was offline.

Personal life
Ghosn is the eldest child of former Nissan and Renault CEO and wanted criminal, Carlos Ghosn, and his first wife Rita Khordahi. In July 2018 Ghosn married Nicholas Flanders in Naoshima, Japan.

References

1987 births
Living people
American women chief executives
Stanford University alumni
American technology chief executives
American debutantes
American people of Lebanese descent
Chief operating officers
American women business executives
21st-century American businesspeople
American corporate directors
Women corporate directors
Debutantes of le Bal des débutantes
Brazilian Maronites
McKinsey & Company people
21st-century American businesswomen